Nikolay Avramov Svinarov (born 6 May 1958) is a Bulgarian politician who served as the Minister of Defence in the Sakskoburggotski cabinet between 2001 and 2005.

Life 

Born in Shoumen, Svinarov completed his legal studies at Sofia University in 1982 and subsequently worked as an attorney.

He was a member of the 39th and 40th National Parliaments.

On 24 July 2001, Svinarov assumed his duties as Minister of Defense in the Sakskoburggotski government and fulfilled his full mandate, stepping down on 17 August 2005.

Between 5 December 2007 and 25 June 2009, he held the position of chairman of the parliamentary group of Bulgarian New Democracy (Bulgarian: Българска нова демокрация).

References 

20th-century Bulgarian lawyers
1958 births
Living people
People from Shumen
Government ministers of Bulgaria
Sofia University alumni